Jagatpur is a village development committee in Chitwan District, Bagmati Province, Central Development Region, Nepal. At the time of the 2011 Nepal census it had a population of 11,195 people (5,217 male; 5,978 female) living in 2,635 individual households.

Jagatpur is a fastest growing tourism town, lies on 20 km Northwest part of the district headquarters Bharatpur and serves as a gateway for the thousands of internal and external tourist every year to famous adobe of the wildlife and headquarters of Chitwan National Park Kasara. The area with large number of luxurious hotels and natural beauties is a popular internal and external tourist destination from many years. Mainly, It is famous for exploring jungle on elephant rides seeing rare animals like one horned rhino and various species of wild cats. As a government crocodile breeding project and an old temple of Hindu God Bikram Baba inside the Chitwan National Park its quite famous among the locals. Furthermore, The National Park shares as direct inside route of another popular tourist town of the district Sauraha.

Directions
By air: In addition to good road access, Jagatpur has good air connections through Bharatpur airport with regular daily air services from Pokhara and Kathmandu. The airport lies just 20 kilometer to the northeast of Jagatpur. Will need to change to bus or taxi for connection to Jagatpur.
By bus
Via Kathmandu: there are different types of buses available. You can find direct route bus in from kathmandu to Jagatpur as Local buses service from Narayani Transportation organization or you can take kathmandu-Bhartpur buses and change from Jagatpur Bus-park or Lions Chowk. And you will also find regular tourist buses 
as direct route to Jagatpur.

Via Pokhara: direct tourist buses are available via Mugling, Narayangarh / Bharatpur, Jagatpur; 3 – 4 hours.

Besides Kathmandu and Pokhara mostly you will find direct route to Bharatpur/Narayangarh, for which you need to take another bus/taxi for Jagatpur either in Jagatpur(west chitwan bus park) bus park or in Lions Chowk.

References

Populated places in Chitwan District
Village development committees (Nepal)